Amblema is a genus of freshwater mussels, aquatic bivalve mollusks in the family Unionidae, the river mussels.

Species within the genus Amblema
 Amblema elliottii (Coosa threeridge)
 Amblema neislerii (Fat threeridge)
 Amblema plicata (Threeridge)

References

Unionidae
Taxonomy articles created by Polbot
Bivalve genera
Taxa named by Constantine Samuel Rafinesque